Peltola is a district in the Uittamo-Skanssi ward of the city of Turku, in Finland. It is located in the southeast of the city, and consists mostly of industrial area. There is also a vocational school in Peltola, and many people refer to it simply as 'Peltola'.

The current population of Peltola is 778, and it is decreasing at an annual rate of 0.77%. 14.27% of the district's population are under 15 years old, while 23.78% are over 65. The district's linguistic makeup is 91.65% Finnish, 7.58% Swedish, and 0.77% other.

See also
 Districts of Turku
 Districts of Turku by population

Districts of Turku